Banaz: A Love Story is a 2012 documentary film directed and produced by Deeyah Khan. The film chronicles the life and death of Banaz Mahmod, a young British-Iraqi woman of Kurdish origin killed in 2006 in South London on the orders of her family in a so-called honour killing. The film received its UK premiere at the Raindance Film Festival in London September 2012.

Synopsis
Banaz Mahmoud was born in Iraqi Kurdistan and moved to England with her family when she was 10 years old. At the age of 17, her parents had arranged a marriage between her and a man 10 years older than her.  Within months the marriage turned violent and Banaz requested a divorce. In the coming months, Banaz fell in love with someone of her own choosing, something which was found to be shameful by her family. Banaz was kept in confinement by her family, beaten, and forbidden to see her lover. She escaped and sought help from authorities, to no avail. She wrote a letter to police, detailing her situation and stating that her father should be investigated if anything were to happen to her. In January 2006, Banaz was killed by family members, in a plot which was initiated by her father. In total, Banaz went to the police 5 times before her death, but did not get the help she needed. Detective Chief Inspector Caroline Goode of the Metropolitan Police led the investigation to recover the body of Banaz and her killers, securing the first ever extradition from Iraq to Britain.

Film screenings

Banaz: A Love Story has been re-versioned for ITV's UK investigative journalism series Exposure, for UK national broadcast on 31 October in co-production with Hardcash Productions and Fuuse Films. The re-versioned film for ITV Exposure is named: BANAZ – AN HONOUR KILLING.

Further screenings of Banaz A Love Story: 
Eurodok Film Festival 
Women's International Film & Arts Festival 2013 (Miami)
The Home Office film screening UK 2012
Glasgow Film Festival 2013
Bergen International Film Festival  2013
WATCH DOCS. Human Rights in Film IFF November 2013 Poland
House of Lords screening United Kingdom December 2013
Swedish Parliament screening January 2014
De Balie Amsterdam Feb 2014
OUR LIVES...TO LIVE FILM FESTIVAL India Feb 2014
Chulalongkorn University Thailand March 2014 
International Film Festival and Forum on Human Rights | 8 March 2014
United Nations Human Rights Council Geneva 10 March 2014
UN New York 6 May 2014

Accolades

HBVA and Memini

During the making of the film, Deeyah worked with experts, activists and NGOs (Non-Government Organizations) specialising in the field of honour-based violence globally, which led to a shared recognition of the urgent need for online educational resources and campaigning networks dedicated to the issue.

As a result, the making of Banaz: A Love Story led to Deeyah founding two independent initiatives:

 HBVA (Honour Based Violence Awareness Network), an international digital resource centre working to advance awareness through research, documentation, information and training for professionals who may encounter women, girls and men at risk, building partnerships with experts, activists, and NGOs from around the world.
 Memini, an online memorial to victims of honour killing. Memini exists to acknowledge the lives and deaths of thousands who are killed in the ongoing massacre of 'honour' killing. "We seek to create a community of remembrance to end the silence, honour the dead and keep their memories alive, collecting and preserving the stories of women like Banaz, as well as celebrating their strength and courage."

See also

 Jineology
 Namus

References

External links
Official website

Deeyah article about why she made the Banaz film
Guardian article about Emmy award for Banaz 
The Observer article about Banaz
Deeyah interview in Norway about Banaz by feminist publication Fett.
Nick Cohen article for Standpoint Magazine about Banaz.

2012 films
2012 documentary films
2010s British films
British documentary films
Documentary films about honor killing
Films directed by Deeyah Khan
Films scored by L. Subramaniam
Norwegian documentary films